The second seeds Joan Hartigan and Gar Moon defeated Emily Hood Westacott and Ray Dunlop 6–3, 6–4, to win the mixed doubles tennis title at the 1934 Australian Championships.

Seeds

  Nell Hall /  Harry Hopman (semifinals)
  Joan Hartigan /  Gar Moon (champions)
  Emily Hood Westacott /  Ray Dunlop (final)
  Alison Hattersley /  Aubrey Willard (semifinals)

Draw

Finals

Earlier rounds

Section 1

Section 2

Notes

References

External links
  Source for seedings
  Source for the draw

1934 in Australian tennis
Mixed Doubles